El Filo is a small town in the municipality of Tecuala State of Nayarit, Mexico. It is one of many towns in Nayarit bordered by the Acaponeta River. It is 1 mile south of Tecuala and 2 miles west of San Felipe de Aztatan. Its population is 953 people according to the 2000 census.

Populated places in Nayarit
Municipalities of Nayarit